49 Camelopardalis is a variable star in the northern circumpolar constellation of Camelopardalis, located 313 light years from the Sun based on parallax measurements. It has the variable star designation BC Camelopardalis; 49 Camelopardalis is the Flamsteed designation. This star is a challenge to view with the naked eye, having a baseline apparent visual magnitude of 6.50. It is moving away from the Earth with a heliocentric radial velocity of +6.5 km/s.

This is a magnetic chemically peculiar star with a stellar classification of A7VpSrCrEuSiKsn, indicating it is an A-type main-sequence star with overabundances of various elements including strontium and europium, as well as broad, "nebulous" lines. The magnetic field of 49 Camelopardalis shows a relatively complex structure, in combination with distinct abundance patterns across the surface. It is classified as an Alpha2 Canum Venaticorum type variable and its brightness varies from visual magnitude +6.43 down to +6.48 with a rotationally-modulated period of 4.29 days.

49 Camelopardalis has 1.9 times the mass of the Sun and 2.3 times the Sun's radius. It is around 891 million years old and is spinning with a period of 4.29 days. The star is radiating 17 times the luminosity of the Sun from its photosphere at an effective temperature of 7,740 K.

References

A-type main-sequence stars
Ap stars
Alpha2 Canum Venaticorum variables
Camelopardalis (constellation)
Durchmusterung objects
Camelopardalis, 49
037934
062140
2977
Camelopardalis, BC